Christian Leberecht Vogel (4 April 1759, in Dresden – 6 April 1816, in Dresden) was a German painter, draughtsman and writer on art theory. His pupils included Louise Seidler, and he was the father of court painter and art professor Carl Christian Vogel.

Life  
A family history, written circa 1914 by Vogel's grandson, Victor Vogel, says: "Christian Leberecht Vogel [was] born in 1750. He became a painter of some renown, was Professor at the Academy of fine Arts at Dresden Saxony Germany. Moved to Waldenfels, a few miles from Lichtenstein. His first great painting was the Alter Painting at the Church of Lichtenstein, 'Suffer the little children to come to unto me and hinder them not for such is the kingdom of God'. Which is still intact today [in 1914]. Thirty years later he repeated the same painting for the Duke of Schoenberg at his Castle in Wildenfels. He lived at Wildenfels from 1780 till 1804. He died in 1816 at the age of sixty-six."

Work  
"Amor and Psyche" 

 Ganymed
 Boy with Birdcage
 Boy with Canary bird, which is at the Royal Picture Gallery at Dresden.
 The Artist's Sons
 A group of Hessian soldiers in 1776 when he was 26, going to help the British fight the Americans. At the time this was a prize possession of the author Victor Vogel circa 1914.
 , Dresden 1812
 , Dresden 1812
 , Dissertation Greifswald 1998

Bibliography 
Some info from Brockhaus Lexicon Vol. 16 page 368
 Gerd-Helge Vogel: . Leipzig 2006.
 Gerd-Helge Vogel: . Zwickau 1996.
 Gerd-Helge Vogel:  In:  4/2005, pp. 324–348.
 Thieme-Becker Vol. 34, 1940, p. 477.

External links 

 

1759 births
1816 deaths
German art historians
18th-century German painters
18th-century German male artists
German male painters
19th-century German painters
Artists from Dresden
German male non-fiction writers
19th-century German male artists